County Road 300 or Ringveg nord ("Ring Road North") is a bypass road running north of Tønsberg, Norway. The road opened on 13 March 2008.

References

300
300
Tønsberg